Nakhon Sawan can refer to
the town Nakhon Sawan
Nakhon Sawan Province
Nakhon Sawan district
the Roman Catholic Diocese of Nakhon Sawan
Monthon Nakhon Sawan, a former administrative entity